Mohammad Irfan (born 31 October 1989) is a Pakistani cricketer. He was the leading wicket-taker for Lahore Whites in the 2018–19 Quaid-e-Azam Trophy, with thirty-four dismissals in seven matches. He was also the leading wicket-taker in the 2018–19 Quaid-e-Azam One Day Cup, with twenty dismissals in nine matches.

References

External links
 

1989 births
Living people
Pakistani cricketers
Lahore Whites cricketers
Pakistan Television cricketers
Sui Southern Gas Company cricketers
Cricketers from Lahore
Southern Punjab (Pakistan) cricketers